"God Is a Dancer" is a song by Dutch DJ Tiësto and English singer Mabel. It was released by Musical Freedom on 20 September 2019 as the third single from Tiësto's sixth studio album The London Sessions (2020). The song is also featured as a bonus track on Digital & Streaming versions of Mabel's debut studio album High Expectations (2019). The song was written by Tiësto, Violet Skies and Josh Wilkinson, and produced by Tiësto and Wilkinson.

Background
Mabel teased the release of the song on her Instagram with the lines "Are You Feeling That Fire?" and "Cause the Music Is on the Way" on 17 September 2019. On 18 September 2019, Tiësto revealed the release date and cover art on his social media. Upon release, a website was set up with the title of the song. It was made available for pre-save on iTunes and Spotify at the same time.

Live performance
Mabel performed "God Is a Dancer" on The Jonathan Ross Show on 9 November 2019.

Track listing

Charts

Weekly charts

Year-end charts

Certifications

References

External links
 

2019 songs
2019 singles
Tiësto songs
Mabel (singer) songs
Songs written by Tiësto
Songs written by Josh Wilkinson